The following lists events that happened during 1951 in the Grand Duchy of Luxembourg.

Incumbents

Events

January – March
 20 March – The United States is given right to use the land of the Luxembourg American Cemetery and Memorial at Hamm in perpetuity.
 Early February - Luxembourg troops arrive in South Korea as, alongside Belgian units, they form a platoon of Belgian United Nations Command during the Korean War.

April – June
 18 April – Luxembourg is one of six founder signatories of the Treaty of Paris, which establishes the European Coal and Steel Community.
 25 April – Prince Jean is appointed to the Council of State, replacing Prince Felix.
 29 May – Societe Electrique de l'Our is founded.
 3 June – Elections are held to the Chamber of Deputies in the Centre and Nord constituencies.  The Luxembourg Socialist Workers' Party (LSAP) gains 4 seats, taking it to nineteen seats, just behind the Christian Social People's Party (CSV).

July – September
 3 July – After the LSAP's gains in the election on 3 June, the CSV replaces its coalition partner, the Democratic Party, with Victor Bodson as Deputy Prime Minister in the new government.
 17 August – Prince Sigvard, Duke of Uppland, Carl Johan Bernadotte, and Prince Lennart, Duke of Småland are created Counts Bernadotte af Wisborg.
 29 August – A law is passed making health insurance mandatory for employees and civil servants.
 September - First contingent of Luxembourg soldiers return from the Korean War.

October – December
 9–13 October - 6 Luxembourg soldiers fight at the Battle of Haktang-ni during the Korean War.
 4 November – The Luxembourg national football team beats Finland 3-0: its last international victory for ten years.
 26 November – Charles Léon Hammes is appointed to the Council of State.

Births
 24 February – Monique Melsen, singer
 27 April – Viviane Reding, politician
 26 May – Michel, 14th Prince of Ligne
 3 August – Lucien Weiler, politician
 20 September – Jhemp Hoscheit, writer
 30 December – Paul Dahm, composer

Deaths
 13 July – Nik Welter, writer and politician

Footnotes

References